Bonnybank is a small village in the Levenmouth area of Fife, approximately 2 miles north of Leven and situated on the main road (the A916) between Kennoway and Cupar. It boasts a popular Mexican restaurant, the Bonnybank Inn. The population make-up is vastly white (99%), with an even split between males and females.

References

Levenmouth
Villages in Fife